Harald Genzmer (9 February 1909 – 16 December 2007) was a German composer of classical music and an academic.

Biography
The son of the legal historian , Genzmer was born in Blumenthal, near Kiel, Germany, he studied composition with Paul Hindemith at the Hochschule für Musik Berlin beginning in 1928.

From 1938 he taught at the Volksmusikschule Berlin-Neukölln. During the early part of the Second World War he served as a military band clarinetist. When his pianistic abilities were noticed by the Musikmeister, he was put on detached duties as a pianist/accompanist for "Lazarettenkonzerte", concerts for recuperating wounded officers. He was based for some time near Garmisch-Partenkirchen, where he made the acquaintance of Richard Strauss. When the war ended, he was offered a post at the Musikhochschule München. This was blocked by the American authorities, and so, from 1946 to 1957 he taught at the Musikhochschule in Freiburg im Breisgau.
 
From 1957 to 1974 he taught at the Musikhochschule München. He hung a framed review from the Süddeutsche Zeitung above his piano, which stated after the premiere of his 1955 Sinfonietta for Strings that it was a work destined only for oblivion. Sharing the frame was a cutting from a few years later, reporting that in the previous year it had been the most performed work for string orchestra in Europe.

Among his notable students are Bertold Hummel, Egyptian composer Gamal Abdel-Rahim, British composer John McCabe, and Japanese composer Toyoko Takami. 

He died on 16 December 2007 in Munich.

Awards
 1960 Music Prize of the Bayerische Akademie der Schönen Künste
 1961 1st Prize of the Deutscher Sängerbund
 1962 Preis zur Förderung der Musik der Stadt München
 1991 Bavarian Maximilian Order for Science and Art
 1996 Kulturpreis der Bayerischen Landesstiftung
 1998 Bayerische Verfassungsmedaille in Gold

Compositions  
Source:

Orchestral works 

 1940 Konzert Nr. 1 für Trautonium und Orchester
 1942 Musik für Streichorchester 
 1946 Erstes Concertino, for piano and strings with flute 
 1948 Konzert für Klavier und Orchester 
 1950 Konzert für Violoncello und großes Orchester 
 1952 Konzert Nr. 2 für Mixtur-Trautonium und Orchester
 1954 Konzert für Flöte und Orchester 
 1955 Sinfonietta, for strings
 1957 rev.1970 1. Sinfonie, for full orchestra
 1957. Kammerkonzert, for oboe and string orchestra.
 1958 2. Sinfonie, for strings 
 1959 Prolog, for orchestra 
 1959 Konzert für Violine und Orchester.  
 1960 Divertimento giocoso for two woodwind instruments and string orchestra 
 1963 Concertino Nr. 2, for piano and strings 
 1963 2. Orchesterkonzert
 1964 Introduktion und Adagio, for strings 
 1965 Der Zauberspiegel, ballet-suite for orchestra
 1965 Concerto for harp and strings 
 1967 Concerto for viola and orchestra 
 1967 Sonatina prima, for strings
 1970 Sinfonia da Camera
 1970 Konzert, for organ and orchestra 
 1971 Sonatina seconda, for strings
 1974 3. Konzert, for piano and orchestra
 1976 Miniaturen, for strings
 1977–1978 Musik für Orchester, after a fragment by Friedrich Hölderlin
 1978 Konzert, for percussion instruments and orchestra 
 1979 Sinfonia per giovani, for large school orchestra
 1980 2. Konzert, for organ and strings
 1983 Konzert, for two clarinets and strings
 1984 Konzert, for four horns and orchestra
 1984 Konzert, for cello, contrabass and strings 
 1985 Sechs Bagatellen for cello and contrabass Pub. Litolff/Peters Nr.8613
 1985 Konzert, for trumpet and strings 
 1985 2. Konzert, for trumpet and strings 
 1986 3. Sinfonie 
 1987 Cassation, for strings
 1990 Vierte Sinfonie, for large orchestra
 1996 Concerto for contrabass and string orchestra 
 1998 Concertino für Flöte, Oboe (Flöte) und Streichorchester 
 1998 Concerto for three trumpets and string orchestra 
 1998 5. Sinfonie, for large orchestra 
 2002 3. Sinfonietta, for string orchestra 
 2. Sinfonietta, for string orchestra
 Concertino, for clarinet and chamber orchestra
 Erstes Concertino, for piano and string orchestra, with obbligato flute
 Festliches Vorspiel, for orchestra
 Kokua, dance suite for large orchestra
 Tarantella
 Burleske
 Kokoa
 Dytiramba
 Konzert, for two pianos and orchestra
 Konzert, for two guitars and orchestra
 Konzert, for flute, harp and strings
 Pachelbel-Suite, for orchestra
 Prolog II, for orchestra

Works for orchestra of wind-instruments 
 1968 Divertimento for symphonic wind ensemble
 1969 Konzert, for cello and winds 
 1974 Ouvertüre für Uster
 Konzert, for trumpet, winds, harp and percussion
 Parergon zur "Sinfonia per giovani", for saxophone orchestra

Dramatic works 
 1965 Der Zauberspiegel, ballet – libretto: Hans Stadlmair

Liturgical music 
 1962 Jiménez-Kantate, for soprano, mixed chorus and orchestra
 1969–1970 Mistral-Kantate, for soprano
 1973 Deutsche Messe, for mixed chorus and organ
 1975–1976 Oswald von Wolkenstein, cantata for soprano, baritone, mixed chorus and orchestra
 1978 Kantate (The mystic trumpeter), for soprano (tenor), trumpet and strings
 1979 Geistliche Kantate, for soprano solo, men's chorus, organ and percussion
 1981 Kantate 1981 nach engl. Barockgedichten, for soprano, mixed chorus and orchestra
 Adventsmotette "Das Volk, das im Finstern wandelt"(Jesaja 9), for men's chorus and organ
 Hymne – zum Fest des St. Antonius von Padua "Der Geist Gottes, des Herrn, ruht auf mir", for men's chorus

Choral works  
 Drei Chorlieder vom Wein, for men's chorus
 Lied des Vogelstellers "Der Vogel, der im Fluge ruht", for mixed chorus
 Tropus ad Gloria, for mixed chorus
 Wach auf, wach auf, for mixed chorus
 Zwei geistliche Festsprüche, for men's chorus and organ
 Lobet den Herrn, alle Heiden (Psalm 117) 
 Lasset das Wort Christi

Vocal music 
 1961–1963 Fünf Lieder, on texts by Luís de Camões, for baritone and piano

Piano works 
 1938 1. Sonate. 
 1940 1. Sonatine.
 1942 2. Sonate.
 1943 Sonata in D, for piano four-hands
 1948 Suite for piano 
 1959 3. Sonatine.
 1960–1962 Préludes
 1963 Dialoge
 1965 Studien, for piano four-hands
 1975 Konzert, for piano and percussion
 1978 4 Elegien, for piano and percussion
 at least five piano sonatas (sonata 5 published in 1985)

Selected Organ works 
 1945 Tripartita in F GeWV 389
 1952 Erste Sonate GeWV 390
 1952 rev. 2000 Konzert (for organ solo)  GeWV 391
 1956 Zweite Sonate GeWV 392
 1963 Dritte Sonate GeWV 393
 1966 Adventskonzert GeWV 395
 1968 Die Tageszeiten GeWV 396
 1974 Weihnachtskonzert GeWV 398
 1974 Konzert, for organ and percussion GeWV 417
 1978 Pfingstkonzert GeWV 399
 1980 Osterkonzert GeWV 400
 1981 Fantasie  GeWV 402
 1980–1981 Impressionen
 1994 Triptychon GeWV 408
 1996–1997 Sinfonisches Konzert : no. 2  GeWV 409
 2001–2003 Musik der Trauer GeWV 412
 2002 Präludium, Arie und Finale  GeWV 413
 Lento misterioso II 
 Sonata for trumpet and organ (published 1971) GeWV 416
 Sonata for cello and organ

Selected chamber works

 1939 First Sonata for Flute and Piano 
 1941 Sonate für Altblockflöte und Klavier 
 1943 Violin Sonata No. 1
 1945 Second Sonata (in E minor) for Flute and Piano 
 1947 Trio for flute, viola and harp 
 1949 Streichquartett Nr. 1 
 1949 Violin Sonata No. 2
 1949 Scherzo für Mixtur-Trautonium und Klavier
 1953 Sonatina for Violine and Piano No. 1 
 1954 Violin Sonata No. 3 
 1955 Second sonata for viola and piano
 1957 Wind quintet 
 1957 Sonate für viola 
 1967 1. Sonatine für Violoncello und Klavier 
 1973 Sonatine für Viola und Klavier 
 1974 Quartett für Klarinette, Violine, Violoncello und Klavier 
 ©1975 Zwölf Duos für zwei Posaunen
 1978 Capriccio für Marimbaphon 
 1980 Violin Sonata No. 4
 1981 Sonate für Violoncello Solo 
 1981 Sonatine für Kontrabaß und Klavier 
 1981 Divertimento für Violoncello und Fagott 
 1982 2. Sonatine für Violoncello und Klavier 
 1983 Acht Fantasien für Vibraphon 
 1983–1984, revised 1991 Sonate für violine solo 
 1986 Sonate für Gitarre 
 1988 Trio für Klarinette, Violoncello und Klavier 
 1990 Sonate für Flöte und Harfe 
 1992 Pan : für Querflöte solo oder Altquerflöte in G solo 
 1995 Quintet for Clarinet and Strings 
 1995 Violin Sonata No. 5
 1995 Sonatina for Violin and Piano No. 2
 1995 Sonatina for Violin and Piano No. 3
 1997 Sonate für Klarinette (B♭) und Klavier 
 1999 Fantasie-Sonate: für Flöte und Gitarre 
 2002 Improvisationen für Altblockflöte solo 
 Sonatas for cello and piano (first sonata published in 1954, another composed 1963 )
 Suite of Dances for Electronic Instruments

Sources
Lukas, Victor. Reclams Orgelmusikfürer. Stuttgart: Philipp Reclam June 1992.

References

External links
 
 Harald Genzmer Schott

1909 births
2007 deaths
German classical composers
20th-century classical composers
Mendelssohn Prize winners
Olympic bronze medalists in art competitions
Officers Crosses of the Order of Merit of the Federal Republic of Germany
Academic staff of the Hochschule für Musik Freiburg
Pupils of Paul Hindemith
German male classical composers
20th-century German composers
Trautonium players
Medalists at the 1936 Summer Olympics
20th-century German male musicians
Olympic competitors in art competitions